Arturo Berned  (born 26 May 1966 in Madrid, Spain), is a Spanish sculptor whose works are conceived on the basis of mathematical laws and geometrical layouts charged with symbolism. In 1993 he graduated in Architecture, a profession that he exercised for several years and combined with his love of sculpture. In the year 2000 he began to dedicate himself entirely to sculpture.

Biography 

Arturo Berned was born in Madrid on 26 May 1966 and graduated in Architecture from the Escuela Técnica Superior de Arquitectura (Higher School of Technical Architecture) at the Universidad Politécnica de Madrid (Polytechnic University of Madrid).
With the benefit of study grants he completed his course and carried out his first architecture and planning commissions in London, Oxford, Turin and Mexico before finally becoming established in Madrid at the end of the 1990s when he joined the Estudio Lamela Arquitectos practice.

With the Lamela practice he held the post of Projects and Works Manager and was involved in a variety of projects including Terminal T4 at Madrid Barajas Airport (Richard Rogers) and the Real Madrid Sports Centre.

In early 2000 he was awarded First Prize in the National Projects and Works Competition for Architecture for his work on the Infanta Leonor Hospital in Madrid which he worked on jointly with Ramón Araujo and Luis Vidal. The same year he was also awarded First Prize in the Concurso Internacional Puerta Escultura Flagship (International Competition Flagship Sculpture Door) Loewe.

This was to be the starting point for him beginning to develop his vocation for sculpture by dedicating himself to researching into the forms and materials which were to later define the identity of his artistic work. The results of this stage were exhibited in Madrid in 2008 in his first solo exhibition.

Following several years of work and exhibitions, in 2012 the IVAM (Valency Institute of Modern Art) is host to what was up to then his most ambitious exhibition. The Valency institution selects some 50 works for exhibition which are representative of his career to date.

A year later he became the first Spanish artist to form a part of the Christian Dior collection with an exhibition entitled “Lady Dior As Seen By”, which opened in Hong Kong (where artists from all over the world express their interpretation of the iconic Lady Dior bag).

One of his most recent works is a participation in the "Spanish – Japanese dual year" with a sculpture project sponsored by the Japanese architect Toyo Ito (Pritzker Prize in 2013). The exhibition comprises eight large scale sculptures which result from his living in Japan and which pay tribute to the Japanese people and culture. With this exhibition the artist brought to an end the phase entitled MU which refers to a blank sheet of paper, an attitude of openness without preconceived ideas or prejudices.

Working method 

Arturo Berned conceives his sculptural works on the basis of mathematical laws and geometrical forms, using a high degree of technical precision and a highly refined form of production. The result is a conceptually abstract work created on the basis of the golden section (also known as the golden number or the phi number).

The material that he normally uses is steel (stainless, lacquered, corten) although on occasions he has been known to make use of aluminium or bronze.

His sculptures are of a variety of sizes while it is the monumental or urban format which best defines his work possibly due to the influence from his background in architecture and planning.

Exhibitions 

 Representative for Spain in the Spain – Japan Dual Year (2013-2014)
 “Lady Dior as seen by”, Hong Kong (2013)
 Biennial of the South, Panama (2013)
 Art Madrid ´13, Madrid (2013)
 IV Biennial of Contemporary Art ONCE, Madrid (2012)
 “Sculpture Underway”, IVAM Museum, Valency (2012)
 Espacio de Las Artes, Madrid (2011)
 Feriarte, Madrid (2011)
 (1+√5)/2, Leitner Building, Madrid (2011)
 Art Madrid ´11, Madrid (2011)
 Exhibition “Contemporary Sculptors” in the Bosque de Acero, Cuenca (2010)
 Ansorena Gallery, Madrid (2010)
 Shopping Centre El Zielo, Madrid (2009)
 Open Art Fair, Netherlands, Gaudí Gallery (2009)
 Gaudí Gallery, Madrid (2009)
 Art Madrid ´09, Madrid (2009)
 Arrow ´09, Madrid (2009)
 “Arturo Berned”, Estudio Lamela, Madrid (2008)
 The art Work of architects. COAM Cultural Foundation, Madrid (2000)
 Everyday Objects. Vanguardia Gallery, Bilbao (1998).

Awards 

 Selected for the International Public Sculpture Competition Parque del Levante, Murcia (2013)
 First Prize International Monumental Sculpture Competition Puerto Venecia, Zaragoza (2012)
 First Prize International Competition Puerta Escultura Flagship Loewe, Madrid (2001)
 Selected for the International Constructions Sculpture Prize Sacejo, Oviedo (2007)
 International Sculpture Prize Caja Extremadura, Cáceres (2008)

Collections 

 IVAM Collection
 CHRISTIAN DIOR** Collection
 BMW Collection
 Grupo CASER Collection
 IBERDROLA Collection
 LOEWE Foundation
 Maraya Foundation
 Economy and Treasury Department 
 UNESID Unión de Empresas Siderúrgicas (Engineering and Metalworking Business Union)
 Museo Modernista Can Prunera, Palma de Mallorca

References

External links 
 Artist´s web page
 www.vogue.es
 www.abc.es
 www.ivam.es
 fueradeserie.expansion.com
 www.aragondigital.es
 ecodiario.eleconomista.es
 www.lavozdegalicia.es
 www.revistadearte.com
 www.lasprovincias.es
 www.arteenlared.com
 www.fundaciononce.es
 infoenpunto.com
 www.disenodelaciudad.es
 richardrabel.com
 arteyculturafundaciononce.wordpress.com
 www.lavozdegalicia.es
 www.revistadearte.com

Living people
Spanish sculptors
Spanish male sculptors
Abstract sculptors
1966 births